Bukovac may refer to:

People
 Tom Bukovac (born 1968), American musician and producer
 Vlaho Bukovac (1855–1922), Croatian painter

Places

Bosnia and Herzegovina
 Bukovac (Brčko), a village in Brčko District
 Bukovac, Derventa, a village in Derventa municipality
 Bukovac (Doboj), a village in Doboj municipality
 Bukovac (Gradiška), a village in Gradiška municipality, Republika Srpska

Croatia
 Bukovac, Maksimir, a neighborhood in the Maksimir district of Zagreb
 Bukovac Perjasički, a village in Karlovac County
 Bukovac Perušićki, a village in  Perušić
 Bukovac Svetojanski, a village in Zagreb County

Montenegro
Bukovac, Plužine, a village in Plužine

Serbia
 Bukovac, Despotovac, a village in Despotovac
 Bukovac (Mionica), a village
 Bukovac, Novi Sad, a village near Novi Sad
 Bukovac, Preševo, a village
 Bukovački Salaši, a suburban settlement near Sombor
 Bukovac palace, a building in Zrenjanin

See also  
 Bucovăț (disambiguation)
 Bukovče (disambiguation)
 Bukovec (disambiguation)
 Bukovets (disambiguation)